The Austrian Mathematical Society is the national mathematical society of Austria and a member society of the European Mathematical Society.

History
The society was founded in 1903 by Ludwig Boltzmann, Gustav von Escherich, and Emil Müller as Mathematical Society in Vienna.

After the Second World War it resumed operation in May 1946 and was formally reestablished at the 10th of August 1946 by Rudolf Inzinger. In autumn 1948 the name was changed to Austrian Mathematical Society.

Publications

It publishes the "International Mathematical News" with three issues per year (not to be confused with Mathematische Nachrichten, an unrelated mathematics journal). It was issued for the first time in 1947. It also publishes the mathematics journal Monatshefte für Mathematik in cooperation with Springer-Verlag.

Prizes

Every year it awards its main prize to a promising young mathematician. It also awards smaller prizes for the best dissertation, diploma and high-school thesis in mathematics.

References

External links
 Official website

Learned societies of Austria
Mathematical societies
Science and technology in Austria
Organizations established in 1903
1903 establishments in Austria